The Roman Catholic Diocese of Limeira is a diocese located in the city of Limeira in the Ecclesiastical province of Campinas in Brazil.

History
 April 29, 1976: Established as Diocese of Limeira from the Metropolitan Archdiocese of Campinas and Diocese of Piracicaba

Bishops
 José Roberto Fortes Palau (20 November 2019 – present)
 Vilson Dias de Oliveira, D.C. (2007.06.13–2019.05.17)
 Augusto José Zini Filho (2003.01.22–2006.11.15)
 Ercílio Turco (1989.11.18–2002.04.24), appointed Bishop of Osasco, São Paulo
 Fernando Legal, S.D.B. (1985.04.25–1989.03.15), appointed Bishop of São Miguel Paulista, São Paulo
 Ariovaldo Amaral, C.SS.R. (1976.04.29–1984.04.14), appointed Bishop of Campanha, Minas Gerais

Other priests of this diocese who became bishops
Sérgio Aparecido Colombo, appointed Auxiliary Bishop of São Carlos, São Paulo in 2001
José Carlos Brandão Cabral, appointed Bishop of Almenara, Minas Gerais in 2013
José Reginaldo Andrietta, appointed Bishop of Jales, São Paulo in 2015

References

External links
 GCatholic.org
 Catholic Hierarchy
 Diocese website (Portuguese)

Roman Catholic dioceses in Brazil
Limeira, Roman Catholic Diocese of
Christian organizations established in 1976
Roman Catholic dioceses and prelatures established in the 20th century
1976 establishments in Brazil